YNK may refer to one of the following

YNK Interactive, a game developer and publisher in South Korea.
Yeketî Niştîmanî Kurdistan, (Patriotic Union of Kurdistan) a Kurdish political party